Antonio "Toni" Elías Justícia (born 26 March 1983) is a Spanish professional motorcycle racer and inaugural champion of the Moto2 World Championship. He is the third member of the Elías family to compete in motorcycle racing. He currently rides a Suzuki GSX-R1000 in the MotoAmerica AMA Superbike Championship, where he finished 3rd in the 2016 season, with 6 wins out of 18 and 304 points, 7 less than champion Cameron Beaubier. He won the championship in the 2017 season. In 2018 he finished as runner-up behind champion Cameron Beaubier and in 2019 he finished as runner-up, 5 points behind championship winner, once again Beaubier.

Career

Born in Manresa, Catalonia, Spain  Elías started racing in the 125cc World Championship in 2000 at the age of 17, finishing 3rd in 2001 and taking his first win in the Dutch TT at the prestigious Assen circuit. He went to 250cc for 2002, finishing 4th that year, 3rd a year later, and 4th in 2004.

In 2005 he entered MotoGP for Fortuna Yamaha. In 2006 and 2007 his Fortuna backing has got him a ride for Gresini Honda alongside 2005 runner-up Marco Melandri. He only took one podium in 2006, albeit his first, and so far only, win in the top category. After a podium in the first half of 2007 he crashed at Assen, breaking his leg, sabotaging his season. He managed to make a return to the podium at Motegi.

After spending the 2008 season with the Alice Ducati team, Elias returned to Gresini Honda for 2009, replacing Shinya Nakano to ride alongside Alex de Angelis.

For 2010 he moved down to the new Moto2 class, on a Moriwaki bike for Gresini. He was competitive in pre-season testing before a heavy crash threatened to derail his status as title favourite. He was victorious at Le Mans after a chaotic race also led by Alex Debón and Jules Cluzel.  He claimed the lead in the championship following this win, and would not relinquish it for the remainder of the season, clinching the inaugural Moto2 World Championship at the Malaysian Grand Prix with three rounds to spare.

He returned to the MotoGP grid in 2011 with Team LCR, riding a Honda RC212V. 2011 heralded his worst season in the MotoGP class, scoring only 61 points and finishing 15th in the Championship. After Mugello race team and rider ended his relationship.

On 24 July 2012, Pramac Ducati announced that Elias would replace the injured Hector Barbera until he was deemed fit to race. He raced a Satellite version of the GP12. At Laguna Seca he qualified 17th and retired during the race. He was scheduled to ride at Indianapolis but Barbera decided he wanted to return early, however Barbera suffered a high-side in Practice and injured his leg once more. Elias substituted for him until San Marino.

First MotoGP Victory
Elías won his first premier class race on 15 October 2006 with a fantastic final lap of the Portuguese MotoGP at Estoril. Elías had started the lap in third place, but an aggressive braking move into Curva 1, moved him past Valentino Rossi and the then-leader Kenny Roberts, Jr. into the lead. He actually clipped Roberts while braking, and this loss of momentum meant that Rossi passed Roberts for second position. These positions held until the chicane (turns 9 and 10) near the end of the lap. It looked like Elías had left the door wide open for Rossi and the reigning world champion dived to the inside to pass the Spaniard.

However, Elías would keep pressuring Rossi, trying to pass him on the run towards turns 11 and 12. Rossi had the line and kept the position, and it seemed as if Rossi would be 13 points clear of title rival Nicky Hayden going to the final round in Valencia. But Elías kept the speed up through the thirteenth and final turn, and tucked in behind Rossi, to draft him alongside the Italian. In a finish that needed a video replay, Elías was given the race by just 0.002 seconds. It was one of the closest finishes in the history of MotoGP, and a great way for Elías to secure his maiden premier class victory. This victory helped secure him a contract extension, which was doubtful prior to the win at Estoril, with Honda and Fausto Gresini for the 2007 Moto GP season. Elías was the last non-factory rider to win a race until Jack Miller won for the Marc VDS Racing Team at the 2016 Dutch TT.

As it turned out, Elías' victory cost Rossi five points, which was the exact number of points that Rossi would finish behind Hayden in the Championship standings.

MotoAmerica
In 2016, Elias entered the MotoAmerica Superbike category racing for Yoshimura Suzuki Factory Racing team using the number 24, alongside teammate Roger Hayden. Elias took first place in the first three races of the season after being called in for substitute duty. 

Elias won the Superbike championship in 2017 on 10 victories and 18 podium finishes, never finishing lower than second place for any race where he took the checkered flag.

Elias announced his retirement from MotoAmerica Superbike racing at the end of the 2020 season after 32 career wins and 60 career podium finishes for the Suzuki.

Career statistics

Career summary

Grand Prix motorcycle racing
All statistics according to MotoGP.com

By class

Races by year
(key) (Races in bold indicate pole position, races in italics indicate fastest lap)

Superbike World Championship

Races by year
(key) (Races in bold indicate pole position, races in italics indicate fastest lap)

Suzuka 8 Hours Results

MotoAmerica

Races by year

References

External links

 
 

1983 births
Living people
Sportspeople from Manresa
Spanish motorcycle racers
250cc World Championship riders
125cc World Championship riders
Tech3 MotoGP riders
Motorcycle racers from Catalonia
Moto2 World Championship riders
AMA Superbike Championship riders
Pramac Racing MotoGP riders
Gresini Racing MotoGP riders
LCR Team MotoGP riders
MotoGP World Championship riders
Superbike World Championship riders
Moto2 World Riders' Champions